Víctor Manuel Gutiérrez Castro (born 27 January 1978) is a Mexican former football player who last played for Club Sportivo 2 de Mayo.

Element emerged from the basic forces of the Cruz Azul debuted in 1998 with the Cruz Azul Hidalgo affiliate team.
within most years is comvierte in important piece in the team.
He has a runner-up with Cruz Azul in the Copa Libertadores 2001.
Remains in Cruz Azul to 2004 since it is transferred also Jaguares de Chiapas
Hard on the team just a year since starting from the Torneo opening 2005 becomes a reinforcement of the Club Necaxa remains in the rays to the Clausura 2007 since he returned to the team that saw it born where only lasts for one year.
From the 2009 is going to play to Paraguay with 3 may where only lasts for one year.
Since you can't find team withdraws.

Club

National team
He was called on a couple of occasions to the national team during the first era of Javier Aguirre and participated in a World Cup qualifier against the United States. He played on the Mexico National Team at the 2002 CONCACAF Gold Cup.

References

1978 births
Living people
2002 CONCACAF Gold Cup players
Chiapas F.C. footballers
Club Necaxa footballers
Cruz Azul footballers
Footballers from the State of Mexico
Mexico international footballers
People from Naucalpan
Association football defenders
Mexican footballers